Gerrit Gohlke (born 12 March 1999) is a German professional footballer who plays as a centre-back for  club Waldhof Mannheim.

Career statistics

References

External links
 
 

1999 births
Living people
German footballers
Sportspeople from Darmstadt
Footballers from Hesse
Association football defenders
Kickers Offenbach players
SV Waldhof Mannheim players
3. Liga players
Regionalliga players
21st-century German people